Articles on Railway research include:

 International Association of Railway Operations Research
 Matrai, Iran Railway Research Center
 Railway Technical Research Institute, Japan
 British Rail Research Division, Derby